Albatraoz is a Swedish electro house musical group from Borås, Sweden. Formed in 2012 originally by AronChupa, Nicklas Savolainen, Andreas Reinholdsson, Rasmus Sahlberg and Måns Harvidsson.

Career
In 2012 they formed the group as a hobby and rose to fame when their debut single "Albatraoz" was released in 2013. The song reached thirty-six in Swedish Singles Chart and remained eighteen weeks on the chart."Albatraoz" was certified platinum in Sweden. Later that year they signed a record deal with Sony Music. In January 2014 the song reached 8.5 million plays on Spotify and the group toured to promote the song. On 18 April 2014 the group released their second single, "Arriba".

In 2019 Nicklas, Andreas and Rasmus left the group and in 2020 other members joined. They released the hit song "E (Ventex)" which peaked at number 10 on Spotify's "Sweden Top 50"'s chart. Later that year they also had success with the song "Se på mig (Crunk Rock)" which peaked at number 34 on the same list.

Controversy
During a concert in February 2017 in Bohuslän, Sweden, the group made headlines after the member Måns Harvidsson had pressed a female audience member's face towards his groin on stage. This was witnessed by both a security guard at the club and by friends of the victim, who had also filmed the act with her mobile phone. In the recording it can be seen how Harvidsson grasps the victim by her hair and then presses her face against his genitals before he let her go. In an apology to the victim Harvidsson later explains that the girls would never understand the feeling and he compared it with how actors enters a role in a film. He also said, according to the victim and her friend, "how should I know that she didn't want if I didn't try?".

After the incident the record company Sony Music decided to terminate all cooperation between them and Albatraoz. Harvidsson was also fired from the band the same day, all members cut off contact with him and apologized for the former member's sexual assault.

Two years after the incident, in February 2019, Uddevalla District Court sentenced Harvidsson to 80 day-fines for sexual harassment. He was also to pay 5,000 SEK in damages to the victim, which was half of what she had petitioned for. Harvidsson, during his case, had denied the charges and argued that in the event the court would find him guilty, no punishment should be given on the ground that his musical career had already suffered greatly. The court did not find his reasoning valid. Harvidsson was later accused by a second woman from the concert, who claimed that he had flicked her on the buttocks with a towel and kissed her on the neck. The court did not pursue the second allegation, as there was a lack of evidence to support it.

Members

Current 
 AronChupa – record producer, vocals 
 Little Sis Nora - vocals 
 Christoffer Sangré - vocals

Former
Nicklas Savolainen – vocals 
Andreas Reinholdsson – vocals 
Rasmus Sahlberg – vocals, record producer 
Måns Harvidsson – vocals

Discography

Albums

Singles

Promotional singles

Notes

References

External links
Facebook

Electro house musicians
Swedish electronic musicians
Swedish house musicians
Swedish synthpop groups
Musical groups established in 2012
Musical groups from Västra Götaland County
2012 establishments in Sweden